The West Coast Pirates Rugby League Football Club, officially referred to as The Cash Converters West Coast Pirates for sponsorship reasons, are a rugby league football club based in Perth, Western Australia. The club was founded by the Western Australian Rugby League as a bid for Perth to rejoin an expanded National Rugby League in 2026. If successful, the Pirates would play out of HBF Park, with the support of the Western Australian Government through a $96 million upgrade to the venue.

History
Perth previously competed in the national competition as the Western Reds (from 1995-1996), the Perth Reds (1997) and as the WA Reds in the S.G. Ball Cup from 2006-2011. It is unknown at this stage whether the West Coast Pirates will keep the history and playing records of the Reds when they join the NRL or if the Pirates will start from scratch.

Name and logo
The West Coast Pirates were launched in 2012 after WARL research found that just over 50% of the marketplace associated the Western Reds name with failure.
Despite this the club will continue to use the same red, black and gold colours of the Western Reds.

The Pirates Plan
The Pirate's Plan estimates that the club will need two years notice from the NRL to build a competitive squad and aims to be in the top five recognised sporting brands within Australia by 2022. It also identifies the problem WA talent needing to move across the country to play in the NRL and hopes that local players will be able to stay in Western Australia once the club is in the NRL. At the moment players who graduate from the Pirates SG Ball team to the NRL, like Curtis Rona, need to move interstate to continue their career. The Pirates also plan on developing an Intrust Super Premiership side.

Fan support
The West Coast Pirates are widely supported for re-admission into the NRL by players and fans alike. Perth-born players in particular are supportive of Western Australia competing in the NRL once again.

Players
As of 2014 there have been fifteen graduates from the West Coast Pirates that have gone on to earn contracts with NRL clubs, either with the NRL team or with the NRL Under 20's team, including:

Adam Quinlan
Curtis Rona
Waqa Blake
Jordan Pereira
Jackson Topine

Representative players

Sponsors 
The following sponsors for the West Coast Pirates include:

 Cash Converters
 McDonald's
 Player (Racing & Wagering WA)
 The Complete Group

See also

Western Reds
Western Australia Rugby League
Rugby league in Western Australia

References

External links

2012 establishments in Australia
Rugby clubs established in 2012
Rugby league teams in Western Australia
Sporting clubs in Perth, Western Australia
Proposed sports teams
Proposals in Australia
Expansion of the National Rugby League